Night Into Morning is a 1951 American drama film starring Ray Milland, John Hodiak and Nancy Davis.

Plot
Everything is going very well for college professor Phillip Ainley (Ray Milland), who has a loving wife and son and an offer to teach at Yale. But his world turns upside-down when Katherine Mead (Nancy Davis), his secretary, rushes to tell him that there's been a deadly explosion at the professor's home.

His wife and child are killed. Ainley, devastated, becomes morose and turns to drink, causing Mead, a war widow, and best friend Tom Lawry (John Hodiak), her betrothed, to consider these telltale signs that the professor could be suicidal.

A popular athlete on campus has failed an exam and might not graduate, so his girlfriend Dottie (Dawn Addams) appeals to the professor to give him a second chance. A drunken Ainley tells her remaining unmarried might spare them both future heartbreak. He then crashes a car, terrifying the girl and resulting in his arrest.

Character witnesses convince the judge to place Ainley on probation. The professor permits the athlete to take a second exam, then gives him a passing grade. Ainley gets his affairs in order and goes to a hotel, where he plans to take his life. Only a last-minute intervention by Mead saves him, the widow reminding Ainley that she found a new love and new life, just as her first true love would have wanted.

Cast

Ray Milland as Phillip Ainley
John Hodiak as Tom Lawry
Nancy Davis as Katherine Mead
Lewis Stone as Dr. Horace Snyder
Jean Hagen as Girl Next Door
Rosemary De Camp as Annie Ainley
Dawn Addams as Dotty Phelps
Jonathan Cott as Chuck Holderson
Celia Lovsky as Mrs. Niemoller
Gordon Gebert as Russ Kirby
Harry Antrim as Mr. Andersen
Katharine Warren as Mrs. Andersen
Mary Lawrence as Waitress
Herb Vigran as Bartender
Otto Waldis as Dr. Franz Niemoller
John Maxwell as Dr. Huntington
John Jeffery as Timmy Ainley

Reception
According to MGM records the movie earned $556,000 in the US and Canada and $263,000 elsewhere, making a loss to the studio of $312,000.

References

External links
 
 Night Into Morning at TCMDB
 
 

1951 films
1951 romantic drama films
American black-and-white films
American romantic drama films
Films about alcoholism
Films scored by Carmen Dragon
Films set in universities and colleges
Metro-Goldwyn-Mayer films
1950s English-language films
Films directed by Fletcher Markle
1950s American films